Twiddler's syndrome is a malfunction of a pacemaker due to manipulation of the device and the consequent dislodging of the leads from their intended location.  As the leads move, they stop pacing the heart and can cause strange symptoms such as phrenic nerve stimulation resulting in abdominal pulsing or brachial plexus stimulation resulting in rhythmic arm twitching. Twiddler´s syndrome in patients with an implanted defibrilator may lead to inadequate, painful defibrillation-shocks.

References

External links 

Cardiology
Syndromes